Antrobus is a surname. Notable people with the surname include:

Charles Antrobus (1933–2002), British Governor-General of St. Vincent and the Grenadines
Edmund Antrobus (disambiguation), several people
Geoffrey Antrobus (1904–1991), South African cricketer
Gibbs Antrobus (1793–1861), British diplomat and politician
John Antrobus (cricketer) (1806–1878), English clergyman and cricketer
John Antrobus (born 1933), British playwright and scriptwriter
Laverne Antrobus (born 1966), British child psychologist and television presenter
Paul Antrobus (1935–2015), Canadian Baptist missionary and professor of psychology
Peggy Antrobus (born 1935), Grenadian feminist activist, author, and scholar
Raymond Antrobus (born 1986), British poet, educator and writer
Robert Antrobus (1830–1911), British businessman, politician and cricketer
Yvonne Antrobus (born 1940), British novelist, abridger, radio dramatist, and actress
Fictional characters:

George and Maggie Antrobus, characters in the Thornton Wilder play The Skin of Our Teeth
 Antrobus, in the eponymous stories by Lawrence Durrell

See also 

 Antrobus baronets